Mac William Íochtar (Lower Mac William), also known as the Mayo Burkes, were a fully Gaelicised branch of the Hiberno-Norman House of Burgh in Ireland. Mayo covered much of the northern part of the province of Connacht and the Mac William Íochtar functioned as a regional king and received the White Rod. The title was a successor office to the Lord of Connacht which ended upon the assassination of William Donn de Burgh, 3rd Earl of Ulster, in June 1333.

History 
As a result of the Burke Civil War of the 1330s, the Lordship of Connacht was split between two opposing factions of the de Burgh family: the Burkes of Mac William Uachtar (or Clanricarde) in southern Connacht and the Mac William Íochtar Burkes of northern Connacht. For over three hundred years, the two families dominated the politics of the province, frequently fighting each other for supreme rule of both the Anglo-Irish and Gaelic-Irish peoples.

List of Mac William Íochtar

 Edmond Albanach de Burgh, 1st Mac William Íochtar (1332–1334), died November 1375
 Thomas mac Edmond Albanach de Búrca, 2nd Mac William Íochtar (1375–1402)
 Walter mac Thomas de Búrca, 3rd Mac William Íochtar (1402– 7 September 1440)
 Edmund na Féasóige de Búrca, 4th Mac William Íochtar (1440–1458)
 Tomás Óg de Búrca, 5th Mac William Íochtar (1458–1460)
 Risdeárd de Búrca, 6th Mac William Íochtar (1460–1469), died 1473
 Ricard Ó Cuairsge Bourke, 7th Mac William Íochtar (1469–1473), died 1479
 Theobald Bourke, 8th Mac William Íochtar (1479–5 March 1503)
 Ricard Bourke, 9th Mac William Íochtar (1503–7 July 1509)
 Edmond de Búrca, 10th Mac William Íochtar (1509–23 February 1514)
 Meiler Bourke, 11th Mac William Íochtar (1514–28 April 1520)
 Edmond de Búrca, 12th Mac William Íochtar (1520–29 September 1527)
 Seaán an Tearmainn Bourke, 13th Mac William Íochtar (1527–?)
 Theobald mac Uilleag Bourke, 14th Mac William Íochtar (?–1537)
 David de Búrca, 15th Mac William Íochtar (1537–?)
 Ricard mac Seaán an Tearmainn Bourke, 16th Mac William Íochtar (?–1571)
 Seaán mac Oliver Bourke, 17th Mac William Íochtar (1571–1580) and Baron Ardenerie (1580)
 Richard the Iron Bourke, 18th Mac William Íochtar (1580–1582)
 Richard Bourke, 19th Mac William Íochtar (1582–1586)
 William "the Blind Abbot" Bourke, 20th Mac William Íochtar (1586–Abolition, 1593)
 Tibbot MacWalter Kittagh Bourke, 21st Mac William Íochtar (Restoration, December 1595–March 1601) and Marquess of Mayo (Peerage of Spain, 1602)
 Richard "the Devils Hook" Bourke, 22nd Mac William Íochtar (March 1601–October 1601)
 Tibbot ne Long Bourke, 23rd Mac William Íochtar (October 1601–Abolition, January 1602) and Viscount Mayo (1637)

In 1594, Tibbot ne Long Bourke, one of the most prominent men in the country and son of Richard "the Iron" Bourke, 18th Mac William Íochtar (d.1582), accepted terms of surrender and regrant. In 1627, he was created Viscount Mayo.

Genealogy

 Walter de Burgh of Burgh Castle, Norfolk m. Alice
 William de Burgh (d. 1206) m. Daughter of Domnall Mór Ó Briain, King of Thomond
 Richard Mór / Óge de Burgh, 1st Lord of Connaught m. Egidia de Lacy, Lady of Connacht
 Sir Richard de Burgh (d.1248), 2nd Lord of Connaught
 Walter de Burgh, 1st Earl of Ulster (d. 1271)
 Richard Óg de Burgh, 2nd Earl of Ulster (1259–1326)
 John de Burgh m. Elizabeth de Clare
 William Donn de Burgh, 3rd Earl of Ulster (1312–33) m. Maud of Lancaster
 Elizabeth de Burgh, 4th Countess of Ulster (1332–63) m. Lionel of Antwerp, 1st Duke of Clarence
 Philippa Plantagenet, 5th Countess of Ulster (1355–82) m. Edmund Mortimer, 3rd Earl of March
 Roger Mortimer, 4th Earl of March, 6th Earl of Ulster (1374–98)
 Edmund Mortimer, 5th Earl of March, 7th Earl of Ulster (1391–1425)
 Anne Mortimer (1388–1411) m. Richard of Conisburgh, 3rd Earl of Cambridge
 Richard of York, 3rd Duke of York, 8th Earl of Ulster (1411–60)
 Edward IV (Edward, 4th Duke of York, 9th Earl of Ulster)
 House of York (Kings and Queens of England and Ireland)
 Edmond de Burgh
 Sir Richard Burke
 Walter Burke (d. 1432)
 Burkes of Castleconnell and Brittas (Clanwilliam)
 Uileag Carragh Burke
 Burkes of Cois tSiúire (Clanwilliam)
 Sir David Burke, 
 Burkes of Muskerryquirk (Clanwilliam)
 Elizabeth, Queen of Scotland m. Robert I of Scotland
 Theobald de Burgh
 William de Burgh
 Thomas de Burgh
 Egidia de Burgh
 William Óg de Burgh (d. 1270)
 William Liath de Burgh (d. 1324)
 Sir Walter Liath de Burgh, d. 1332
 Sir Edmond Albanach de Burgh (d. 1375),  1st Mac William Íochtar (Lower Mac William), (Mayo)
 Mac William Íochtars, Viscounts Mayo and Earls of Mayo
 John de Burgh (1350–98), Chancellor of the University of Cambridge
 Richard an Fhorbhair de Burgh
 Sir Ulick de Burgh (d. 1343/53), 1st Mac William Uachtar (Upper Mac William) or Clanricarde (Galway)
 Richard Óg Burke (d. 1387)
 Ulick an Fhiona Burke
 Clanricardes, Earls of Marquesses of Clanricarde
 Raymond de Burgh
 Walter Óge de Burgh
 Raymund de Burgh
 Ulick de Burgh of Umhall
 Alice de Burgh
 Margery de Burgh
 Matilda de Burgh
 Daughter de Burgh
 Hubert de Burgh, Bishop of Limerick (d. 1250)
 William de Burgh, Sheriff of Connacht 
 Hubert de Burgh, 1st Earl of Kent (d. 1243) m.
 John de Burgh
 Hubert de Burgh
 Hubert de Burgh
 Barons Burgh
 Geoffrey de Burgh, Bishop of Ely (d. 1228)
 Thomas de Burgh

 Sir Edmond Albanach de Burgh (d. 1375),  1st Mac William Íochtar (Lower Mac William), (Mayo)
 William de Burgh (d.1368)
 Thomas mac Edmond Albanach de Burca, 1375–1402, 2nd Mac William Íochtar
 Walter mac Thomas de Burca (d.1440), 3rd Mac William Íochtar
 Theobald Bourke (d.1503), 8th Mac William Íochtar
 Meiler Bourke (d.1520), 11th Mac William Íochtar
 Ricard Bourke (d.1509), 9th Mac William Íochtar
 Seaán an Tearmainn Bourke (alive 1527), 13th Mac William Íochtar
 Ricard mac Seaán an Tearmainn Bourke (d.1571), 16th Mac William Íochtar
 Edmund na Féasóige de Burca, (d.1458), 4th Mac William Íochtar
 Ricard Ó Cuairsge Bourke (d.1473), 7th Mac William Íochtar
 Edmond de Burca, 10th Mac William Íochtar
 Walter de Burca
 Seaán de Burca
 Oliver de Burca
 Seaán mac Oliver Bourke (d.1580), 17th Mac William Íochtar
 Richard Bourke (d.1586), 19th Mac William Íochtar
 Walter Ciotach de Burca of Belleek (d.1590)
 Tibbot (Theobald) MacWalter Kittagh Bourke, 21st Mac William Íochtar, 1st Marquess of Mayo
 Walter (Balthasar) Bourke, 2nd Marquess of Mayo
 Thomas Ruadh de Burca
 Uilleag de Burca
 Edmond de Burca (d.1527), 12th Mac William Íochtar
 David de Burca (alive 1537), 15th Mac William Íochtar
 Richard the Iron Bourke (d.1583), 18th Mac William Íochtar
 Tibbot (Theobald) ne Long Bourke (1567-1629), 23rd Mac William Íochtar, 1st Viscount Mayo (1627)
 Viscounts Mayo
 William "the Blind Abbot" Bourke (d.1593), 20th Mac William Íochtar
 Theobald mac Uilleag Bourke (d.1537), 14th Mac William Íochtar
 Risdeárd de Burca
 Ricard Deamhan an Chorráin de Burca
 Risdeárd Mac Deamhan an Chorráin (Richard) "the Devils Hook" Bourke (d.1601), 22nd Mac William Íochtar
 Seaán de Burca (d.1456)
 Tomás Óg de Burca, (d.1460), 5th Mac William Íochtar
 Risdeárd de Burca (d.1473), 6th Mac William Íochtar

See also
 County Mayo
 Earl of Mayo
 Viscount Mayo
 Marquess of Sligo
 Baron Connemara
 Carter-Campbell of Possil
 House of Burgh
 Burke Civil War 1333–38
 Clanricarde (Mac William Uachtar/Upper Mac William) or Galway (Upper Connaught) Burkes
 Earl of Clanricarde

References

Further reading
 Hubert T. Knox (1908), The history of the county of Mayo to the close of the sixteenth century, p. 395
 Lower Mac William and Viscounts of Mayo, 1332-1649, in A New History of Ireland IX, pp. 235–36, Oxford, 1984 (reprinted 2002).

History of County Mayo
Irish families
Lordship of Ireland
House of Burgh
Early Modern Ireland